Nikita Vladimirovich Kolyayev (born 23 July 1989) is a Russian former football player.

Club career
He made his debut in the Russian Professional Football League for FC Dnepr Smolensk on 4 September 2014 in a game against FC Znamya Truda Orekhovo-Zuyevo.

References

External links
 
 
 

1989 births
Sportspeople from Almaty
Living people
Russian footballers
Association football forwards
Russian expatriate footballers
Expatriate footballers in Estonia
Expatriate footballers in Israel
Expatriate footballers in Belarus
Expatriate footballers in Latvia
Liga Leumit players
JK Sillamäe Kalev players
FCI Levadia Tallinn players
Maccabi Ironi Bat Yam F.C. players
FC Okean Kerch players
FC Naftan Novopolotsk players
Esiliiga players
Meistriliiga players
Crimean Premier League players
FK Jelgava players
FC TSK Simferopol players
FC Kyzyltash Bakhchisaray players
Russian expatriate sportspeople in Belarus
Russian expatriate sportspeople in Estonia
Russian expatriate sportspeople in Latvia
Russian expatriate sportspeople in Israel